Nalhati Government Polytechnic, is a government polytechnic located in Nalhati, Birbhum district, West Bengal.

About college
Nalhati Government Polytechnic, established in 2015, is a Polytechnic Institution located in Nalhati Municipality, under Birbhum District, West Bengal, India. It is affiliated to the West Bengal Bengal State Council of Technical Education & Vocational Education & Skill Developement (WBSCTE & VE & SD), approved by All India Council for Technical Education (AICTE). This Institution offers Diploma Courses in Mechanical Engineering, Automobile Engineering and Computer Science and Technology. It is controlled by the Department of Technical Education, Training & Skill Development, Government of West Bengal. The Campus is a beautiful place with fine vicinity and plateaus all around in front of Maa Nalateswri Mandir. It is situated beside a water body and surrounded by greeneries.The institute promotes technical education among the youth of rural areas. Apart from West Bengal, the students from adjacent States like Bihar, Jharkhand attend this Institute to study 3-year full time diploma courses. 
This polytechnic is affiliated to the West Bengal State Council of Technical Education,  and recognised by AICTE, New Delhi. This polytechnic offers diploma courses in Automobile, Computer Science & Technology  and Mechanical Engineering.

See also

References

External links
Official website WBSCTE

Universities and colleges in Birbhum district
Educational institutions established in 2015
2015 establishments in West Bengal
Technical universities and colleges in West Bengal